The Extraordinary and Plenipotentiary Ambassador of Peru to the Republic of El Salvador is the official representative of the Republic of Peru to the Republic of El Salvador.

The ambassador in San Salvador is also accredited to Belize.

Both countries established consular relations in 1854 and diplomatic relations followed in 1856. The ambassador to El Salvador was also accredited to other countries in Central America to the point where the legations in Panama and Central America were merged in 1905, only to be again separated in 1939.

List of representatives

See also
List of ambassadors of Peru to Mexico
List of ambassadors of Peru to Central America
List of ambassadors of Peru to Costa Rica
List of ambassadors of Peru to Guatemala
List of ambassadors of Peru to Honduras
List of ambassadors of Peru to Nicaragua
List of ambassadors of Peru to Panama

Notes

References

El Salvador
Peru